Nothing Trivial is a New Zealand comedy-drama television series, produced by South Pacific Pictures. The series is created by the duo of Gavin Strawhan and the co-creator of Outrageous Fortune, Rachel Lang. The pair, who also created the shows Go Girls and This Is Not My Life, both write and executive produce the show.

The series is set around five characters who meet at a pub quiz. All share the characteristic of being unlucky in love.

The series began airing on TV One in July 2011 and the first episode had the highest number of viewers of any locally-made drama debut since 2000.

Cast

Primary
Shane Cortese plays Mac Delany; an advertising guy with a heart of gold who specializes in general knowledge.
Tandi Wright plays Catherine Duvall; an attractive, intelligent and acerbic doctor who specializes in medicine, science, and  anything about France.
Blair Strang plays Brian King; a plumber and serial womanizer who specializes in sports, eighties music and geography.
Nicole Whippy plays Michelle Hardcastle; a franchise owner and vengeful recently divorced wife who specializes in celebrity gossip.
Debbie Newby-Ward plays Emma Wedgewood; a teacher and eternal optimist who does good sympathy and specializes in food and animals.

Secondary
Will Hall plays Cory; The antagonistic leader of the opposition pub team
Katherine Kennard plays Jo Delany; Mac's vindictive ex-wife and mother of his children
Barnie Duncan plays Scotty; Michelle's philandering ex-husband
Aaron Ward as the Quiz Master; The man who runs the quiz
Manon Blackman plays Celeste Duvall; Catherine's teenage daughter
Elizabeth Hawthorne plays Anne; Catherine's mother
Tim Balme plays Jules; Celeste's father
Simon Mead plays Noah Delany; Mac & Jo's elder son
Dylan Holmes plays Frank Delany; Mac & Jo's younger son
Jason Hoyte plays Smudge; Mac's business partner, real name Malcolm.
Mark Mitchinson plays David Manning. Michelle's therapist in season 3.

Cortese said that the cast were already friends before filming started.

Production
In November 2010 it was confirmed that the creators of Go Girls had created a new show and it may be airing on TV One. In December 2010 funding was approved for the show and NZ on Air representatives were said to be excited. 6.9 million was given to the show for a 13 episode run. In March 2011 it was confirmed the show will air later in the year and was described as; "a light-hearted and comedic drama based around five friends with two things in common: a pub quiz and the fact that each of them is unlucky or unhappy in love." Blair Strang, Shane Cortese, Tandi Wright, Nicole Whippy and Debbie Newby-Ward were announced to be in the cast. The show made its debut in July 2011. On 10 October 2011 it was announced that funding had been given for a second season.
On 13 March 2014, New Zealand on Air confirmed that they will help fund a two-hour telemovie to give fans closure.

Reception
The show was met with commercial and critical acclaim. The show gained the record of the highest number of viewers of any locally-made drama debut since 2000. Deborah Hill Cone from the New Zealand Herald stated; "The writing on Nothing Trivial is good enough to have been penned by the guru of romantic comedy, Richard Curtis (Four Weddings and A Funeral, Bridget Jones's Diary). The characters in Nothing Trivial really come alive from the first episode. They seem like people you could know but, of course, wittier... It is a treat." While Simon Wilson agreed with the well structured writing, saying; "(The writing) is witty, it's sharp, it's very tightly put together. The people are walking clusters of mistakes and they are trying to come to terms with that and deal with that. The series will become a celebration of friendship and where friendships might lead. If you do that well, it makes charming television and they are so far doing it well." Melanie Parkes of Yahoo also stated; ""The humour is uniquely and distinctly Kiwi... You don't have to be interested in competitive quizzing to enjoy Nothing Trivial, although if you're a regular pub quizzer yourself, you'll certainly find something pleasantly familiar about it."

It was reported in August 2011 that pub quizzes were receiving a huge surge in popularity due to the success of Nothing Trivial.

List of episodes

Season 1: 2011

Season 2: 2012

Season 3: 2013

Telemovie: 2014

References

2010s New Zealand television series
2011 New Zealand television series debuts
2013 New Zealand television series endings
English-language television shows
New Zealand comedy-drama television series
Television series by All3Media
Television series by South Pacific Pictures
Television shows filmed in New Zealand
Television shows funded by NZ on Air
Television shows set in Auckland
TVNZ 1 original programming